The Airbus A300 is a wide-body airliner.

A300 or A.300 may also refer to:
 A300 road, a main road in Great Britain
 Acorn Archimedes A300, a British home computer
 Aero A.300, a 1938 Czechoslovakian bomber aircraft
 Ansaldo A.300, a 1919 Italian general-purpose biplane aircraft
 Midland Highway (Victoria), a highway in Victoria, Australia bears the designation A300 for most of its route
 RFA Oakol (A300), a British fleet auxiliary vessel
 Weishi A300, a version of Chinese 300 mm rocket artillery
 AMD A300 platform, a system on a chip solution for AMD Ryzen processors